Emmanuelle Chaulet is a French actress. She starred in Eric Rohmer's 1987 comedy Boyfriends and Girlfriends and Jon Jost's 1990 film All the Vermeers in New York.

Filmography
 1987 : L'Ami de mon amie, directed by Éric Rohmer (Blanche)
 1988 : Chocolat, directed by Claire Denis (Mireille Machinard)
 1989 : I Want to Go Home, directed by Alain Resnais
 1990 : All the Vermeers in New York, directed by Jon Jost (Anna)
 2005 : Sundowning, directed by Jim Comas Cole

References

French film actresses
20th-century French actresses
Living people
Year of birth missing (living people)